Netball at the 2015 Southeast Asian Games is being held in OCBC Arena Hall 1, in Kallang, Singapore from 31 May to 7 June 2015.

Participating nations
A total of 68 athletes from six nations are competing in netball at the 2015 Southeast Asian Games:

Competition schedule
The following is the competition schedule for the netball competitions:

Medalists

Medal table

Preliminary round

All times are Singapore Standard Time (UTC+08:00)

Final round

Semi-finals

Gold medal match

Final standing

References

External links
 

2015
2015 in netball
Netball
Kallang
International netball competitions hosted by Singapore